Nicky is a diminutive form of the name Nicholas, Nicola and Nicole, occasionally used as a given name in its own right. It can also be used as a diminutive of Dominic. It  may refer to:

People

Sports
 Nicky Adams (born 1986), English-born Welsh footballer
 Nicky Boje (born 1973), South African cricketer
 Nicky Butt (born 1975), English former footballer
 Nicky Forster (born 1973), English football manager and former player
 Nicky Grist (born 1961), Welsh former rally co-driver
 Nicky Hayden (1981–2017), American motorcycle racer
 Nicky Law (footballer born 1961), English football manager and former player
 Nicky Law (footballer born 1988), English midfielder; son of the above
 Nicky Little (born 1976), New Zealand rugby union footballer
 Nicky Maynard (born 1986), English footballer
 Nicky Rackard (1922–1976), Irish hurler
 Nicky Robinson (rugby union) (born 1982), Welsh rugby union footballer
 Nicky Shorey (born 1981), English footballer
 Nicky Summerbee (born 1971), English former footballer
 Nicky Weaver (born 1979), English football goalkeeper
 Nicky Winmar (born 1965), former Australian rules footballer
 Dolph Ziggler (born 1980), professional wrestler with Nicky as one of his ring names

Music
 Nicky Astria (born 1967), Indonesian rock singer
 Nicky da B (1990–2014), American rapper specializing in the regional genre of bounce music
 Nicky Byrne (born 1978), singer and member of Irish pop group Westlife
 Nicky Chinn (born 1945), British songwriter and record producer
 Nicky Hopkins (1944–1994), English pianist and organist
 Nicky Jam (born 1980), stage name of reggaeton artist Nick Rivera Caminero
 Nicky Mehta, Canadian singer and songwriter
 Nicky Nola (born 1985), Ugandan singer and dancer
 Nicky Romero (born 1989), Dutch DJ and Music Producer
 Nicky Ryan (born 1949), Irish music producer, recording engineer and manager
 Nicky Thomas (born 1949), Jamaican reggae singer
 Nicky Wire (born 1969), Welsh lyricist, bassist and occasional vocalist

Other
 Tsar Nicholas II of Russia (1868–1918), called "Nicky" by Kaiser Wilhelm II and King George V
 Nicky Arnstein (1879–1965), American professional gambler and con artist, best known as the second husband of Fanny Bruce
 Nicky Best, British statistician
 Nicky Campbell (born 1961), Scottish radio and television presenter and journalist
 Nicky Case, Canadian game developer
 Nicky Cruz (born 1938), Christian evangelist and former gang leader
 Nicky Gavron (born 1941), British politician, Deputy Mayor of London (2000-2003, 2004-2008), and member of the London Assembly
 Nicky Gumbel (born 1955), Anglican priest and author
 Nicky Henson (1945–2019), English actor
 Conrad Hilton, Jr. (1926–1969), American socialite and businessman; grand-uncle of Nicky Hilton
 Nicky Hilton (born 1983), American socialite, heiress and fashion designer, sister of Paris Hilton
 Nicky Katt (born 1970), American actor
 Nicky Jones (born 1996), American kid actor
 Nicky Morgan (born 1972), British Member of Parliament (MP), former Education Secretary (2014-2016)
 Nicky Verstappen (1987–1998), Dutch victim of homicide

Fictional characters
 Nicky, hero of the film Little Nicky, played by Adam Sandler
 Nicky (Avenue Q), in the Broadway musical Avenue Q
 Nick Tilsley, originally called Nicky, in the soap opera Coronation Street
 The title character of the movie Nicky Deuce
 Nicky Katsopolis, a character from Full House
 Nicky Pearson, a character on This Is Us
 Nicky Spurgeon, a character from Focus, played by Will Smith
 Nicky, a character in the Geronimo Stilton book series

See also

 Nickey (disambiguation)
 Nickie (disambiguation)
 Nicki
 Nikky
 Niky

Hypocorisms